The Koteka are seven major ethnicities of the highlands of Western New Guinea in Indonesia (particularly Papua province) with a common culture: the Lani, Mee, Amungme, Moni, Damal, Yali and Nduga. The Koteka share their identity with other peoples in southern areas, such as the Muyu, Mandobo and Kamoro.

See also

Indigenous people of New Guinea
Koteka Tribal Assembly
Koteka

Indigenous ethnic groups in Western New Guinea
Ethnic groups in Indonesia